Manan-gu is a district of the city of Anyang in Gyeonggi-do, South Korea.

Administrative divisions
Manan-gu is divided into the following "dong"s.
Anyang 1 to 9 Dong
Seoksu 1 to 3 Dong
Bakdal 1 to 2 Dong

See also
Anyang, Gyeonggi
Dongan-gu

 
Anyang, Gyeonggi
Districts in Gyeonggi Province